Rinzia polystemona, commonly known as the desert rock myrtle, is a plant species of the family Myrtaceae endemic to Western Australia.

The shrub is found in the far eastern Goldfields-Esperance region of Western Australia near the border with South Australia and the Northern Territory.

References

polystemona
Endemic flora of Western Australia
Myrtales of Australia
Rosids of Western Australia
Taxa named by Ferdinand von Mueller
Taxa named by Barbara Lynette Rye